The Idolmaster is a series of raising simulation and rhythm video games created by Namco Bandai Games (formerly Namco). Its first game premiered in Japan in 2005 as an arcade game, and the series has grown to numerous ports, sequels and spin-offs across multiple video game consoles, including three social network games. While the series is largely only available in Japan, the three versions of The Idolmaster Shiny Festa were localized into English and released worldwide on iOS. The Idolmaster series has spawned many works in other media including anime, manga, novels, radio shows and drama CDs.

In addition to the video game series, the stand-alone anime series Idolmaster: Xenoglossia has its own manga and novel adaptations, and the manga series Puchimas! Petit Idolmaster later inspired an anime series and drama CDs. The music releases in the series include over 100 albums and singles with songs sung by the voice actors from the games. Many of the music releases feature the songs in remix versions in different arrangements. The Idolmaster had earned over 10 billion yen in music CD and concert sales as of 2013. Various companion books for the games and anime adaptations have also been released which include detailed walkthroughs for the games and art collections.

Video games
Each game in the main series deals with the training of prospective pop idols on their way to stardom. The main talent agency featured in the series is 765 Production, and other studios introduced in later games include 876 Production featured in The Idolmaster Dearly Stars, and 961 Production originally introduced in The Idolmaster SP, but which later returns in The Idolmaster 2. While the first set of games are set in the same timeline up to and including The Idolmaster SP, a separate timeline is introduced in The Idolmaster Dearly Stars, the first game in the franchise's next stage called "2nd Vision", which was described as The Idolmasters next project that would further expand the series' world. As the series progressed, two social network games were developed: The Idolmaster Cinderella Girls in 2011 and The Idolmaster Million Live! in 2013; both games feature a card battle system and together introduced over 100 additional idols. A third social network game was developed in 2014 titled The Idolmaster SideM, which also features a card battle system and only contains male idols.

Anime

Radio shows
There have been 15 radio shows for The Idolmaster hosted by the voice actors of the idols from the video games and anime adaptations, five of which are still ongoing. While two of the shows have been broadcast on traditional radio channels, with the advent of the Internet, the remaining 13 have been distributed online. Used primarily to promote the franchise, 12 of the shows are for the video games and the remaining three are for the anime adaptations Idolmaster: Xenoglossia (2007), The Idolmaster (2011) and Puchimas! Petit Idolmaster (2013). Many of the shows have later been released on CD compilation volumes.

Soundtracks

Series

Other releases

Drama CDs

Print media

Manga
The Idolmaster has been adapted into 26 serialized manga created by one or two authors, as well as several manga anthologies featuring multiple artists. These manga include direct adaptations of the video games and anime adaptations, in addition to spin-offs with original storylines. The various manga have been published since 2005 by ASCII Media Works, Enterbrain, Fox Shuppan, Hakusensha, Ichijinsha, Kadokawa Shoten, Kodansha and Square Enix.

Serializations

Not yet in tankōbon format
, illustrated by Proton, serialized in Hakusensha's The Hana to Yume since the November 1, 2012 issue.
, illustrated by Ajiichi, serialized in Square Enix's Gangan Online between September 12, 2013, and February 12, 2015.
The Idolmaster Cinderella Girls, written by Yuniko Ayana, illustrated by Sō Ueto, serialized in Ichijinsha's Comic Rex between the October 2015 and May 2016 issues.

Anthologies

Novels

Companion books

References

Media
Media lists by video games franchise
Anime and manga lists
Mass media by franchise